The 2002–03 Argentine Primera B Nacional was the 17th season of second division professional of football in Argentina. A total of 20 teams competed; the champion and runner-up were promoted to Argentine Primera División.

Club information

Torneo Apertura Standings

Torneo Clausura Standings

Overall standings

Promotion Playoff
This leg was played between the Apertura and the Clausura winner, but  as Atlético de Rafaela won both tournaments, was declared champion and was automatically promoted to 2003–04 Primera División, so the match was played between the best teams placed in the overall standings under Atlético de Rafaela; Argentinos Juniors and Quilmes. The winning team was promoted to 2003–04 Primera División and the losing team played the Promotion Playoff Primera División-Primera B Nacional.

|-
!colspan="5"|Promotion Playoff

Promotion Playoff Primera División-Primera B Nacional
The Promotion playoff loser (Argentinos Juniors) and the team placed 4th in the overall standings (San Martín (M)) played against the 18th and the 17th placed of the Relegation Table of 2002–03 Primera División.

|-
!colspan="5"|Relegation/promotion playoff 1

|-
!colspan="5"|Relegation/promotion playoff 2

 Talleres (C) remains in Primera División after winning the playoff.
Nueva Chicago remains in Primera División after winning the playoff.

Relegation

Note: Clubs with indirect affiliation with AFA are relegated to the Torneo Argentino A, while clubs directly affiliated face relegation to Primera B Metropolitana. Clubs with direct affiliation are all from Greater Buenos Aires, with the exception of Newell's, Rosario Central, Central Córdoba and Argentino de Rosario, all from Rosario, and Unión and Colón from Santa Fe.

Metropolitana Zone

Interior Zone

Relegation Playoff Matches

|-
!colspan="5"|Relegation/promotion playoff 1 (Direct affiliation vs. Primera B Metropolitana)

|-
!colspan="5"|Relegation/promotion playoff 2 (Indirect affiliation vs. Torneo Argentino A)

El Porvenir remains in Primera B Nacional after a 1-1 aggregate tie by virtue of a "sports advantage". In case of a tie in goals, the team from the Primera B Nacional gets to stay in it.
CAI remains in the Primera B Nacional by winning the playoff.

See also
2002–03 in Argentine football

References

External links

Primera B Nacional seasons
2002–03 in Argentine football leagues